Technopark, Kollam is an industrial park in Kundara, Kollam, It is a satellite park of Technopark that is situated 63 km away from the Trivandrum Campus. This is the first district level IT Park established in Kerala. The Technopark Kollam is situated in of land beside Kanjiracode Lake. This park is developed as a Special Economic Zone.

Technopark Kollam houses domestic firms, mainly startups and MNC's engaged in a wide variety of activities, which include software development, mobile app development, enterprise solutions, business analytics, embedded system, internet of things, cloud computing, medical transcription and business process outsourcing.

History 
The plan for setting up the first district IT park in Kerala at Kollam was announced in January 2009. Foundation stone for park was laid by Chief minister of Kerala, Shri. V. S. Achuthanandan in February 2009. The park was set up expecting employment to the tune of 20,000 and investments of 800 crores. The land for the project was acquired by Kerala State Information Technology Infrastructure Ltd to set up Hub-and-spoke model of IT industry in Kerala.

The first phase of park was inaugurated by V. S. Achuthanandan on 15 February 2011. The park area was declared as Special Economic Zone. The park holds unique distinction of water-transport connectivity.

The park was showcased in GITEX Expo 2012 at Dubai.

On 1 February 2014, the first company in the park, Twixt Technologies, started operations.

In March 2014, Comptroller and Auditor General of India in his report criticized KSITIL and its hub, noting that the land acquired for the IT park had been poorly utilized.

Remote work during the COVID-19 pandemic led to a steep decline of attendance in the park.

Accessibility and facilities 
This technological park is accessible by road, rail and water modes of transport. Kundara railway station in Kollam–Sengottai Line is the nearest railway station. National Highway 183 (India) passes through near the park and National Highway 744 (India) passes through nearby town of Kundara.The Ashtamudi Lake adjoining the park has Kerala State Water Transport Department's boat services.

The Taluk Hospital Kundara under Health department is situated near the park entrance. Kerala Fire And Rescue Services facility is also available near the campus.

The nearest airport is Trivandrum International Airport which is 70 km away.

The park face connectivity troubles due to Level crossing and narrow roads. Public transport connectivity to park is also poor.

Infrastructure 
Phase 1 of the park is now complete with Ashtamudi building a seven-storey office building with 100,000 sq.ft space. Further phases are in planning stage.

See also 

 Technopark, Trivandrum
 Techno-lodge
 Kundara

References 

Industrial parks in India